Thomas Jefferson High School is a secondary school located in the Southmoor Park neighborhood, on the southeast side of Denver, Colorado, United States.  It is operated under the Denver Public Schools.  The school teams are the Spartans. The school and its athletic fields are undergoing significant renovations, both of which were built in 1960.

The school offers Advanced Placement classes in English, mathematics, science, social studies, and Spanish. It also hosts a gifted program in various areas of study, such as the Computer Magnet Program, JROTC, concurrent enrollment and X-Track courses.

Thomas Jefferson's programs include a student-run newspaper, student-run newscasting, Computer Magnet Program (CCT), yearbook assembled in-house, diversity club, National Honor Society, and DECA.

Demographics
As of 2022–2022 1,374 students were enrolled.

473 White
258  African American
47 Asian
7 Native American
6 Hawaiian Native/Pacific Islander
497 Latino or Hispanic
86 Two or More Races
634 Female
740 Male

Using federal government guidelines, 47% of the students were eligible for free or reduced-price lunch.

Alumni

 Pierre Allen - (b 1987) retired NFL football defensive end.
 Michael Dinner - (b 1953) director, producer, and screenwriter for television. '80s hit The Wonder Years.
 Kyle Freeland - (b 1993) is a professional baseball pitcher for the Colorado Rockies
 Malcom Glenn -  (b 1987) is a writer and speaker and was The President of The Harvard Crimson
 Daniel Graham - (b 1978) is a former NFL tight end for Denver Broncos
 Jim Gray - (b 1959) is a sportscaster currently with Showtime
 Tyler Green - (b 1970), is a former MLB pitcher, who played for Philadelphia Phillies
 Brad Handler - (b 1967) is an entrepreneur and attorney.
 Brent Handler - (b 1969) is an entrepreneur who works in the destination club industry. 
 Kristina M. Johnson - (b 1957) is an American business executive, engineer, academic, and former government official.
 Chaney Kley - (1972-2007) was an actor known for his role in Darkness Falls.
 DeWayne Lewis - (b 1985) is an NFL cornerback who played for Cincinnati Reds.
 Derrick Martin - (b 1985) is an NFL safety who played for Baltimore Ravens.
 Jovan Melton - Colorado State Representative - House District 41, House Majority Deputy Whip
 John Stearns - (1951–2022), nicknamed "Bad Dude", was a All-Star MLB professional baseball catcher and coach for the New York Mets.
 Barney Visser - (b 1949) is an entrepreneur and author and owner and driver in NASCAR 
 Michael Winslow - (b 1958) is an actor, comedian and beatboxer known for the Police Academy films.
 Andre Woolfolk - (b 1980) is a retired NFL cornerback for the Tennessee Titans.
 Leni Wylliams - (b 1961) was a dancer, choreographer, artistic director and master teacher.

References

External links
Official site

High schools in Denver
Educational institutions established in 1960
Public high schools in Colorado
1960 establishments in Colorado